Philippe Duron (born 19 June 1947) is a French politician. He was the mayor of Caen between 2008 and 2014 and deputy for Calvados's 1st constituency.

Philippe Duron received a degree in history in 1975 and was a teacher until 1997. His political models are Pierre Mendès France and François Mitterrand. As first secretary of the Socialist Party in Calvados, he has been successful in uniting the parties on the left in all of Lower Normandy.

He was elected president of the regional council of Lower Normandy on March 28, 2004, the first member of France's Socialist Party to be elected to this office. He defeated the incumbent for 18 years, René Garrec.

Philippe Duron has also been the mayor of Louvigny (Calvados), and was elected mayor of Caen on 16 March 2008.

He served as deputy to the National Assembly from 1997 to 2001, and again from 2007 to 2017.

Due to the limits on the number of elected positions that can be held simultaneously in France, he stepped down from the regional presidency on 3 April 2008.

References
 Normandie Magazine, April–May 2004, No.  192. Retrieved June 12, 2005
 L'Express.fr, February 23, 2004. Retrieved June 12, 2005.

1947 births
Living people
Mayors of Caen
Presidents of French regions and overseas collectivities
People from Antony, Hauts-de-Seine
Politicians from Normandy
Socialist Party (France) politicians
University of Caen Normandy alumni
Deputies of the 13th National Assembly of the French Fifth Republic
Deputies of the 14th National Assembly of the French Fifth Republic